Hughart is an unincorporated community in Greenbrier County, West Virginia, United States.

The community was named after nearby Hughart Creek.

References

Unincorporated communities in Greenbrier County, West Virginia
Unincorporated communities in West Virginia